Wake is a 2009 comedy drama romance independent film directed by Ellie Kanner and starring Bijou Phillips, Ian Somerhalder, Jane Seymour, Danny Masterson, and Marguerite Moreau.

Plot summary 
Carys Reitman (Bijou Phillips) compulsively attends strangers' funerals. At one funeral, she meets Tyler (Ian Somerhalder), a man mourning the death of his fiancée. Despite the warnings of her best friend, undertaker Shane (Danny Masterson) and her roommate Lila (Marguerite Moreau), she develops a connection with Tyler. Searching for answers, Carys goes to see her estranged mother (Jane Seymour) to confront her past. And as she tries to open herself to the risks of love with Tyler, she realizes she may have more to fear than just a broken heart.

Cast 
 Bijou Phillips as Carys Reitman
 Ian Somerhalder as Tyler
 Danny Masterson as Shane
 Marguerite Moreau as Lila
 Jane Seymour as Mrs. Reitman 
 Sprague Grayden as Marissa
 Kevin Alejandro as Detective Daniels
 David Zayas as Detective Grayson
 Charlie Adler as Priest

Release 
The film was the Opening Night film at the 2009 Cinequest Film Festival. It later was a Spotlight Presentation at the Newport Beach Film Festival. The film was released by E1 Entertainment on DVD and digital platforms on April 20, 2010. It has played on both Showtime and Starz in the US. It was released internationally by Moving Pictures.

References

External links
 Official website
 
 

2009 films
Films directed by Ellie Kanner
2009 romantic comedy-drama films
American romantic comedy-drama films
2009 comedy films
2009 drama films
2000s English-language films
2000s American films